John Williams (bardic name: Ab Ithel) (7 April 1811–27 August 1862), was an antiquary and Anglican priest.  Born in Llangynhafal, Denbighshire Wales in 1811, he graduated from Jesus College, Oxford in 1835 to become the Anglican curate of Llanfor, Merionethshire, where he married Elizabeth Lloyd Williams.  In 1843 he became perpetual curate of Nercwys, Flintshire, and rector of Llanymawddwy, Merionethshire, in 1849.

Writing career
For much of his early life he adopted the pseudonym Cynhaval, after his birthplace in Llangynhafal, Denbighshire, however took the pseudonym Ab Ithel from the surname of his grandfather, William Bethell.  His first book entitled The Church of England independent of the Church of Rome in all ages, concerned the relationship between the Church of England and Rome.  This book was published in 1836.  It was followed by another in 1844 on the ecclesiastical antiquities of Wales entitled Ecclesiastical Antiquities of the Cymry or The Ancient British Church.  In 1856 Archdeacon Williams produced Rules of Welsh Poetry and Medical Practice of Rhinwallon and his Sons with the Welsh MSS. Society.  By 1860 he had two more pieces of work ready for publication; Chronicle of the Princes, and Annales Cambriae were both published in Rolls series.

Williams was industrious both as a parish priest and as an antiquary.  He was regarded by many of his contemporaries as one of the leading Welsh scholars of his day, and was able to exert a considerable and decidedly mixed influence on the course of Welsh scholarship.  Nonetheless his enthusiasm and Welsh nationalist fervour, cause some to criticize him of being uncritical in his approach to the historical record and strongly influenced by Edward Williams (Iolo Morganwg, 1747–1826).

Professional contributions
In 1846, together with Harry Longueville Jones (1806–1870), another cleric and antiquary, Williams founded the Cambrian Archaeological Association, whose journal, Archaeologia Cambrensis, he edited until 1853, when he and Jones quarrelled over editorial policy. He also published an edition and translation of the Gododdin in 1852, established the Cambrian Journal, which he edited from 1854 until his death, and was prominent in the Welsh Manuscripts Society, editing four of its publications.  The Llangollen Eisteddfod of 1858, which he organized together with Richard Williams Morgan ('Mor Meirion', c. 1815 – c. 1889) and Joseph Hughes ('Carn Ingli', 1803–1863), caused much derision and embarrassment; Williams' own family won several prizes, and Thomas Stephens (1821–1875) was adjudicated against because he suggested that the story of Madog ab Owain Gwynedd's American expeditions was not true. Williams was nevertheless considered for the chair of Celtic at Oxford University, and he was appointed by the government in 1858 to complete the editions of the medieval Welsh chronicles Annales Cambriae and Brut y Tywysogion, which had been left incomplete by Aneurin Owen (1792–1851), and which were published in 1860.  His editorial work was later criticised by academics due to his lack of the diplomatic skills for interpreting medieval manuscripts.

Religious appointments
Williams became rector of Llanenddwyn and Llanddwywe, Merionethshire, in 1862, by which time he was very ill, and he died in the same year. The Ab Ithel Memorial Fund was established in his memory.

Writings, letters, and collections
Many of the letters and papers of Rev. John Williams ('') and his family exist today in drafts or incomplete copy.

References

Bibliography
Phillimore, Egerton (ed.), 1890/1 'The publication of the Welsh historical records', Y Cymmrodor 11 (1890/1) pp. 133–75.

External links
 – a posthumous republication of work that originally appeared in the Cambrian Journal

 
 

19th-century Welsh Anglican priests
Welsh non-fiction writers
Alumni of Jesus College, Oxford
Members of the Cambrian Archaeological Association
1811 births
1862 deaths
Llangynhafal